Alexandru Laurențiu Oroian (born 27 January 2001) is a Romanian professional footballer who plays as a midfielder for Liga I club FC Hermannstadt.

Career statistics

Club

Honours
UTA Arad
Liga II: 2019–20

References

External links
 
 

2001 births
Living people
People from Mediaș
Romanian footballers
Romania youth international footballers
Association football midfielders
Liga I players
Liga II players
FC UTA Arad players
FC Hermannstadt players